The International Red Cross and Red Crescent Movement, the world's largest group of non-governmental organizations working on humanitarian aid, is composed of the following bodies:

The International Committee of the Red Cross (ICRC), a committee of Swiss nationals based in Geneva, Switzerland, which leads the international movement and which has special responsibilities under international humanitarian law.
The International Federation of Red Cross and Red Crescent Societies (IFRC), which is the body composed of all the National Red Cross and Red Crescent Societies and was established to coordinate international relief actions and promote humanitarian activities, also based in Geneva, Switzerland.
The 192 individual National Societies of the ′International Federation of Red Cross and Red Crescent Societies′, which despite the name includes the Red Star of David Society in Israel.

Members of the International Federation of Red Cross and Red Crescent Societies (IFRC) 

The data of the members of International Federation of Red Cross and Red Crescent Societies can be found on the Federation-wide Databank and Reporting System (FDRS). It provides data insights on the world's largest humanitarian network of Red Cross and Red Crescent Societies around the world. 
 

Afghanistan: Afghan Red Crescent Society
Albania: Albanian Red Cross
Algeria: Algerian Red Crescent
Andorra: Andorran Red Cross
Angola: Angola Red Cross
Antigua and Barbuda: Antigua and Barbuda Red Cross Society
Argentina: Argentine Red Cross
Armenia: Armenian Red Cross Society
Australia: Australian Red Cross
Austria: Austrian Red Cross
Azerbaijan: Red Crescent Society of Azerbaijan
Bahamas: Bahamas Red Cross
Bahrain: Bahrain Red Crescent Society
Bangladesh: Bangladesh Red Crescent Society
Barbados: Barbados Red Cross Society
Belarus: Belarus Red Cross
Belgium: Belgian Red Cross
Belize: Belize Red Cross Society
Benin: Red Cross of Benin
Bhutan: Bhutan Red Cross Society 
Bolivia: Bolivian Red Cross
Bosnia and Herzegovina: Red Cross Society of Bosnia and Herzegovina
Botswana: Botswana Red Cross Society
Brazil: Brazilian Red Cross
Brunei: Brunei Darussalam Red Crescent Society
Bulgaria: Bulgarian Red Cross
Burkina Faso: Burkinabe Red Cross Society
Burundi: Burundi Red Cross
Cambodia: Cambodian Red Cross
Cameroon: Cameroon Red Cross Society
Canada: Canadian Red Cross
Cape Verde: Red Cross of Cape Verde
Central African Republic: Central African Red Cross Society
Chad: Red Cross of Chad
Chile: Chilean Red Cross
China, People's Republic of: Red Cross Society of China
Hong Kong: Hong Kong Red Cross (autonomous branch of the Red Cross Society of China)
Macau: Macau Red Cross (autonomous branch of the Red Cross Society of China)
Colombia: Colombian Red Cross
Comoros: The Comoros Red Crescent
Republic of the Congo: 
Democratic Republic of the Congo: Red Cross of the Democratic Republic of the Congo
Cook Islands: Cook Islands Red Cross
Costa Rica: Costa Rica Red Cross
Côte d'Ivoire: Red Cross Society of Côte d'Ivoire
Croatia: Croatian Red Cross
Cuba: Cuban Red Cross
Cyprus: Cyprus Red Cross
Czech Republic: Czech Red Cross
Denmark: Danish Red Cross
Djibouti: Red Crescent Society of Djibouti
Dominica: Dominica Red Cross Society
Dominican Republic: Dominican Red Cross
Ecuador: Ecuadorian Red Cross
Egypt: Egyptian Red Crescent Society
El Salvador: Salvadoran Red Cross Society
Equatorial Guinea: Red Cross of Equatorial Guinea
Eswatini: Baphalali Eswatini Red Cross Society
Eritrea: Red Cross Society of Eritrea
Estonia: Estonian Red Cross
Ethiopia: Ethiopian Red Cross Society
Fiji: Fiji Red Cross Society
Finland: Finnish Red Cross
France: French Red Cross
Gabon: Gabonese Red Cross Society
Gambia: Gambia Red Cross Society
Georgia: Red Cross Society of Georgia
Germany: German Red Cross (Baden Red Cross and Bavaria Red Cross, are still existing as the divisions of the German Red Cross)
Ghana: Ghana Red Cross Society
Greece: Hellenic Red Cross
Grenada: Grenada Red Cross Society
Guatemala: Guatemalan Red Cross
Guinea: Red Cross Society of Guinea
Guinea-Bissau: Red Cross Society of Guinea-Bissau
Guyana: Guyana Red Cross Society
Haiti: Haiti Red Cross Society
Honduras: Honduran Red Cross
Hungary: Hungarian Red Cross
Iceland: Icelandic Red Cross
India: Indian Red Cross Society
Indonesia: Indonesian Red Cross Society
Iran: Red Crescent Society of the Islamic Republic of Iran
Iraq: Iraqi Red Crescent Society
Ireland: Irish Red Cross Society
Israel: Magen David Adom in Israel
Italy: Italian Red Cross
Jamaica: Jamaica Red Cross
Japan: Japanese Red Cross Society
Jordan: Jordan National Red Crescent Society
Kazakhstan: Kazakh Red Crescent
Kenya: Kenya Red Cross Society
Kiribati: Kiribati Red Cross Society
North Korea: Red Cross Society of the Democratic People's Republic of Korea
South Korea: Republic of Korea National Red Cross (KRC)
Kuwait: Kuwait Red Crescent Society
Kyrgyzstan: Red Crescent Society of Kyrgyzstan
Laos: Lao Red Cross
Latvia: Latvian Red Cross
Lebanon: Lebanese Red Cross
Lesotho: Lesotho Red Cross Society
Liberia: Liberian Red Cross Society
Libya: Libyan Red Crescent
Liechtenstein: Liechtenstein Red Cross
Lithuania: Lithuanian Red Cross Society
Luxembourg: Luxembourg Red Cross
Madagascar: Malagasy Red Cross Society
Malawi: Malawi Red Cross Society
Malaysia: Malaysian Red Crescent Society
Maldives: Maldivian Red Crescent
Mali: Mali Red Cross
Malta: Malta Red Cross Society
Marshall Islands: Marshall Islands Red Cross Society
Mauritania: Mauritanian Red Crescent
Mauritius: Mauritius Red Cross Society
Mexico: Mexican Red Cross
Micronesia, Federated States of: Micronesia Red Cross Society
Moldova: Red Cross Society of the Republic of Moldova
Monaco: Red Cross of Monaco
Mongolia: Mongolian Red Cross Society
Montenegro: Red Cross of Montenegro
Morocco: Moroccan Red Crescent
Mozambique: Mozambique Red Cross Society
Myanmar: Myanmar Red Cross Society
Namibia: Namibia Red Cross Society
Nepal: Nepal Red Cross Society
Netherlands: Netherlands Red Cross
New Zealand: New Zealand Red Cross
Nicaragua: Nicaraguan Red Cross
Niger: Red Cross Society of Niger
Nigeria: Nigerian Red Cross Society
North Macedonia: Red Cross of the Republic of North Macedonia
Norway: Norwegian Red Cross
Pakistan: Pakistan Red Crescent
Palau: Palau Red Cross Society
Palestine: Palestine Red Crescent Society
Panama: Red Cross Society of Panama
Papua New Guinea: Papua New Guinea Red Cross Society
Paraguay: Paraguayan Red Cross
Peru: Peruvian Red Cross
Philippines: Philippine Red Cross
Poland: Polish Red Cross
Portugal: Portuguese Red Cross
Qatar: Qatar Red Crescent Society
Romania: Romanian Red Cross
Russia: Russian Red Cross Society
Rwanda: Rwandan Red Cross
Saint Kitts and Nevis: Saint Kitts and Nevis Red Cross Society
Saint Lucia: Saint Lucia Red Cross
Saint Vincent and the Grenadines: Saint Vincent and the Grenadines Red Cross
Samoa: Samoa Red Cross Society
San Marino: Red Cross of the Republic of San Marino
São Tomé and Príncipe: São Tomé and Príncipe Red Cross
Saudi Arabia: Saudi Red Crescent Authority
Senegal: Senegalese Red Cross Society
Serbia: Red Cross of Serbia
Seychelles: Seychelles Red Cross Society
Sierra Leone: Sierra Leone Red Cross Society
Singapore: Singapore Red Cross Society
Slovakia: Slovak Red Cross
Slovenia: Slovenian Red Cross
Solomon Islands: Solomon Islands Red Cross
Somalia: Somali Red Crescent Society
South Africa: South African Red Cross Society
South Sudan: South Sudan Red Cross
Spain:  (CRE)
Sri Lanka: Sri Lanka Red Cross Society
Sudan: Sudanese Red Crescent
Suriname: Suriname Red Cross
Sweden: Swedish Red Cross
Switzerland: Swiss Red Cross
Syria: Syrian Arab Red Crescent
Tajikistan: Red Crescent Society of Tajikistan
Tanzania: Tanzania Red Cross National Society
Thailand: Thai Red Cross Society
Timor-Leste: Timor-Leste Red Cross Society
Togo: Togolese Red Cross
Tonga: Tonga Red Cross Society
Trinidad and Tobago: Trinidad and Tobago Red Cross Society
Tunisia: Tunisian Red Crescent
Turkey: Turkish Red Crescent
Turkmenistan: Red Crescent Society of Turkmenistan
Tuvalu: Tuvalu Red Cross Society
Uganda: Uganda Red Cross Society
Ukraine: Ukrainian Red Cross Society
Uruguay: Uruguayan Red Cross
United Arab Emirates: Red Crescent Society of the United Arab Emirates
United Kingdom: British Red Cross
British Virgin Islands: British Virgin Islands Red Cross (autonomous branch of the British Red Cross)
Turks & Caicos Islands: Turks & Caicos Red Cross Society (autonomous branch of the British Red Cross)
United States of America: American Red Cross
Uzbekistan: Red Crescent Society of Uzbekistan
Vanuatu: Vanuatu Red Cross Society
Venezuela: Venezuelan Red Cross
Vietnam: Viet Nam Red Cross Society
Yemen: Yemen Red Crescent Society
Zambia: Zambia Red Cross Society
Zimbabwe: Zimbabwe Red Cross Society

Societies not members of the IFRC 
Faroe Islands: Faroe Islands Red Cross
Indonesia: , in competition with the Indonesian Red Cross Society (as a sectarian religious body it is ineligible for recognition)
Kosovo:
Red Cross of Kosovo
Kosova Red Crescent Association
Northern Cyprus: North Cyprus Red Crescent Society (observer)
Rojava: Kurdish Red Crescent (only states are authorized to use Red Crescent or the Red Cross symbols)
Sahrawi Arab Democratic Republic: Sahrawi Red Crescent (observer)
Taiwan (Republic of China):
Red Cross Society of the Republic of China (previously recognized by the ICRC, but not a member or observer of the Federation)
Red Swastika Society (as a sectarian religious body it is ineligible for recognition)
Nauru, Niue, Oman, and the Vatican City are the states without national societies, along with the states with limited recognition, such as Abkhazia, Republic of Artsakh, Somaliland, South Ossetia, Transnistria.

See also 
International Red Cross and Red Crescent Movement
International Federation of Red Cross and Red Crescent Societies
International Committee of the Red Cross
Sovereign Military Order of Malta
Black Cross Nurses
International Blue Cross
Green Cross International
German Green Cross, Austrian Black Cross, Black Cross Christian Delegate Aid

Notes

References

External links 
International Federation of Red Cross and Red Crescent Societies
The IFRC wide databank and reporting system
International Committee of the Red Cross
National Societies profiles 
International Red Cross and Red Crescent Movement

Red Cross and Red Crescent